Big Boy is a 1925 musical written by Harold R. Atteridge, music by James F. Hanley and Joseph Meyer, and lyrics by Buddy DeSylva. The show featured Al Jolson as Gus, a downtrodden African-American stable boy who ends up as a jockey winning the Kentucky Derby. The all-but-one-man show, which introduced the standard "It All Depends on You", was turned into a film in 1930.

References

External links

1925 musicals
American plays adapted into films
Kentucky Derby
Broadway musicals